Gower Street is a street in Los Angeles, California that has played an important role in the ongoing evolution of Hollywood, particularly as the home to several prominent Poverty Row studios during the area's Golden Age. It marks the eastern terminus of the Hollywood Walk of Fame.

Location 
Gower Street begins at the corner of 1st Street (Los Angeles) in the Hancock Park district as a residential street, becomes primarily industrial, and then commercial as it bisects the Hollywood district, becomes residential again north of Franklin Avenue, and terminates in Beachwood Canyon at Beachwood Drive near the Hollywood Sign. Gower Street marks the western boundary of the Hollywood Forever Cemetery just south of Santa Monica Boulevard.

Origin of the name 
A farmer from Hawaii named John T. Gower brought in the area's first harvesting equipment and built his home near this street before his death in 1880, a time when Hollywood was an independent city. Upon Hollywood's annexation by the city of Los Angeles in 1910, this street was named in his honor.

Movie studios 
Many of the original Hollywood movie studios were located on or near Gower Street. The Paramount Pictures lot sits on the corner of Gower Street and Melrose Avenue; further north, the Sunset Gower Studios (formerly the Columbia Pictures lot) sit on the corner of Sunset Boulevard and Gower.

First studio 
Gower Street was the location of the first motion picture studio built in Hollywood. Nestor Studios, founded by David and William Horsley and operated by Al Christie in 1911, the Christie Studios occupied a building at the northwest corner of Gower Street and Sunset Boulevard. Later, this same location was home to the Columbia Drugstore, famous for a soda fountain, frequented by many young movie stars. The drugstore was also home to an outdoor magazine and newspaper vendor where many celebrities bought their hometown newspapers.

The original Nestor Studios site went through various owners until the Columbia Broadcasting System (CBS) bought it in 1935. CBS demolished Hollywood's historic first studio, and built a $2 million facility that set the stage for the era of television in Hollywood.

Gower Gulch 
Beginning in the 1930s, Gower Street earned the nickname "Gower Gulch" because of the many extras in Westerns who would dress in their cowboy costumes at home, then walk south to Paramount and RKO studios, which were all located just off Gower Street south of Sunset Boulevard. Today, a strip-mall named "Gower Gulch", built to resemble a Western set, sits on the southwest corner of Sunset and Gower as a reminder of that era. The phrase "Gower Gulch" is painted on an actual chuck wagon that sits on the site of the old "Copper Skillet" coffee shop, where the cowboys used to have their breakfast.

Gower Street became very well known to wartime movie audiences in the film Thank Your Lucky Stars (1943) when Dennis Morgan and Joan Leslie visit "Gower Gulch". They hear Spike Jones and His City Slickers at the movie colony village situated at the northern end of Gower Street in the Hollywood Hills. Although the scene is a set built in the studio, it is a faithful replica of the actual village that stood there built from discarded movie sets.

References in popular culture 

The street was the subject of a comic song heard in a 1951 Warner Bros. "Daffy Duck" cartoon called "Drip-Along Daffy". The song is called "The Flower of Gower Gulch" and was written by Michael Maltese (1908–1981), though he is uncredited in the actual short.

The street was also featured in the Warren Zevon song "Desperados Under the Eaves", though referred to as "Gower Avenue" to preserve the meter of the song.

Hollywood Walk of Fame 
The Hollywood Walk of Fame (which runs east to west on Hollywood Boulevard) begins at the corner of Hollywood Boulevard and Gower Street.

Streets in Los Angeles
Streets in Hollywood, Los Angeles